This is a list of Arizona State Sun Devils football players who were drafted into the NFL.

Key

Selections

References 

Arizona State Sun Devils

Arizona State Sun Devils NFL draft